Operation Black Thunder is the name given to two operations that took place in India in the late 1980s to flush out remaining pro-Khalistan Sikh militants from the Golden Temple using 'Black Cat' commandos of the National Security Guards and commandos from Border Security Force. Like Operation Blue Star, these attacks were on the Sikh militants based in the Golden Temple in Amritsar, Punjab.

Operation Black Thunder I

The first Operation Black Thunder took place on 30 April 1986. About 200 radical Sikh militants had been occupying the temple premises for the last 3 months. The operation was commanded by Kanwar Pal Singh Gill, who was the DGP of Punjab. About 300 National Security Guards commandos stormed the Golden Temple, the holiest shrine of the Sikhs, along with 700 Border Security Force troops and captured about 200 Sikh militants. One person was killed and two were injured. The operation, which lasted eight hours, was approved by then Chief minister of Punjab Surjit Singh Barnala of Shiromani Akali Dal. The operation had full support by moderate Sikh leaders and several leaders praised the police action for flushing out terrorists, separatists and anti-faith elements.

Operation Black Thunder II
  
Operation Black Thunder II (sometimes just referred to as Operation Black Thunder) began on 9 May 1988 in Amritsar and ended with the surrender of the militants on 18 May. The operation was commanded by Kanwar Pal Singh Gill who was the DGP of Punjab Police. Snipers were used in this operation. Compared to Operation Blue Star, little damage was inflicted on the Golden Temple. In what was reported as a successful operation, around 200 militants surrendered, 41 were killed.
Gill stated that he did not want to repeat the mistakes made by the Indian army during Operation Blue Star. This operation was described as a severe setback to the Anandpur Resolution implementation movement. In contrast to prior operations, minimum force was used under full public scrutiny. It is remembered for the free access the news media was provided unlike during Operation Blue Star. The day after the militants surrendered, nine reporters were allowed into the Temple complex. Kirtan was resumed at the Golden Temple on 23 May 1988 after a two-week break during this operation.

While Operation Blue Star was widely considered poorly executed and shambolic because of the egregious loss of civilian lives and the damage done to both the Golden Temple and Sikh relations with the government (culminating in the assassination of Indira Gandhi by her bodyguards and anti-Sikh riots), Operation Black Thunder was far more successful with the blockade tactics paying dividends, and has been credited with breaking the back of the Sikh separatist movement.  Soon after this operation, the Indian Government banned the use of religious shrines for political and military purposes and increased penalties for the possession and use of illegal weapons, as part of its strategy to fight extremism in the Punjab region.

In 2002, Sarabjit Singh, then Deputy Commissioner of Amritsar at the time published a book "Operation Black Thunder: An Eyewitness Account of Terrorism in Punjab".  The account was criticised by Kanwar Pal Singh Gill who claimed that the operation was initially called "Operation Gill" before being renamed "Operation Black Thunder".

See also
Khalistan
Kharku
Operation Blue Star
Operation Woodrose

References

External links
 AP News Report on the incidents of May 1988 in the Golden temple.

1986 in India
1988 in India
History of Sikhism
Sikh terrorism in India
Amritsar
Insurgency in Punjab
History of Punjab, India (1947–present)
Counterterrorism in India